Banner Lakes at Summerset State Park is a  state park in Warrem County, Iowa, United States, near the city of Indianola. Opened in 2004, the park is located on the site of a 1930s coal mine; its two namesake lakes were formed from the remnants of the mine.

Both lakes at Banner Lakes are stocked with trout and are also home to bluegill, channel catfish, crappie, and largemouth bass. Each lake has its own boat ramp. The park is also popular with bicyclists, as it contains a  paved loop trail that links with the longer Summerset Trail and six mountain bike courses. It also includes several hiking trails. The Banner Shooting Range, which is also run by the Iowa Department of Natural Resources, is adjacent to the park.

References

State parks of Iowa
Protected areas of Warren County, Iowa